Comilla Victoria Government College is a college in Comilla, Bangladesh. It is one of the oldest and renowned colleges in Comilla as well as in Chittagong division. The college is located beside of Ranir Dighi on 32 acres of land including its intermediate and honors section.

History

The College was established in 1899 by Roy Bahadur Ananda Chandra Roy. Sattendranath Boshu was the first principal of the college and remained in that position until he died 

Fazlul Karim was the first Muslim teacher of this college in 1937. He later became the Vice Principal of the college in 1958 until his retirement in 1972 when the college was made a government college.

Academics
At present, the college has 15,000 students and 147 teachers, of whom 36 are women.

Freedom fighters
Many students of Comilla Victoria College joined the Bangladesh liberation war in 1971. A memorial has been built inside the campus commemorating the sublime contribution of these freedom fighters.

Housing

Comilla Victoria College has five dormitories: four for boys and one for girls. About 1,000 students reside in these dormitories.

Faculty 
There are currently four departments under Comilla Victoria Government University College.

Cultural 
The educational institution has been festive every day in the activities of 13 cultural organizations.
These organizations are also leading national and local level cultural fields. The students of BNCC (Army), BNCC (Air Force), Red Crescent, Victoria College Bitarko Parishad, Victoria College Theater, Rover Scouts, Campus Barta, Blood Donor Organization, Nongar, Botany Society, Career Club and Science Club are conducting cultural and social work of college.

Notable alumni
 Ashab Uddin Ahmad, a Bangladeshi writer, educator and politician. He was a member of the East Bengal Legislative Assembly for the United Front, and a Communist activist. In 2005, he was posthumously awarded the Ekushey Padak for his contributions to literature, which include 24 published books in Bengali and English.
 Muzaffar Ahmed Advisor of Provisional Government of Bangladesh in 1971 
 Sachin Dev Burman, music director of Indian Bollywood film industry.
 Abu Osman Chowdhury, Lieutenant Colonel
 Fazlul Halim Chowdhury (1 August 1930–9 April 1996) was the longest-serving (1976–1983) vice-chancellor of Dhaka University. He passed HSC exam from this college in science in 1947.
 Kamal Dasgupta,a twentieth-century Bengali music director, composer and folk artist.
 Afzal Khan, Politician, Freedom Fighter & Founder of Many Educational Institutions.
 Santi Ghose, is known for her participation in an armed revolutionary struggle.
 Ajit Kumar Guha a Bengali educationist. He was awarded Ekushey Padak in 2013 posthumously by the Government of Bangladesh.
 Kazi Shamsul Hoque, a journalist, editor of weekly Akhon Samoy, New York City, United States passed B.A. from this college.
 Dewan Sirajul Huq, Former Member of Parliament from Comilla-4(Now Brahmanbaria-4) and one of the founding members of Bangladesh Nationalist Party.
 Syed Mahmud Hossain is a Bangladeshi lawyer and jurist who is currently the 22nd Chief Justice of Bangladesh.
 Mustafa Kamal is the current finance minister of Bangladesh.
 Abdus Suttar Khan, a Bangladeshi Oxford Scholar and aerospace researcher.
 Rural development propagator and Ramon Magsaysay Award winner Akhtar Hameed Khan was a principal of the college in the 1950s.
 Masud Ali Khan, a Bangladeshi television, film and stage actor.
 Ramendu Majumdar, actor, stage director, and theatre producer
 Advaita Mallabarmana, an Indian Bengali writer. He is mostly known for his novel Titash Ekti Nadir Naam
 Rafiqul Islam Miah is an ex-minister of Bangladesh.
 Bidya Sinha Saha Mim is a Bangladeshi actress and model.
 Abdul Awal Mintoo, passed HSC exam from this institute in 1966 in science group.
 Mujibul Haque Mujib, a member of the Bangladeshi parliament for the constituency of Comilla-11 and was the former Minister for Railways of Bangladesh. 
 Salauddin Mumtaz was a military officer who fought for the Bangladeshi side in the 1971 Bangladeshi War of Independence and was also posthumously given the title Bir Uttom.
 Khan Sarwar Murshid, educationist and diplomat
 A B M Musa, a Bengali journalist. He was the chief editor of Bangladesh Sangbad Sangstha (BSS). He was awarded Ekushey Padak for journalism in 1999 by the Government of Bangladesh.
 Sachindra Lal Singh - 1st Chief Minister of Tripura state .
 AB Siddique, a drafter of the Constitution of Bangladesh and member of parliament
 Arfanul Haque Rifat is a Bangladeshi Politician and Mayor of Comilla.

Gallery

See also
 List of Educational Institutions in Comilla
 Dhaka City College

References

External links

College website

1899 establishments in British India
Colleges affiliated to National University, Bangladesh
Education in Cumilla
Colleges in Comilla District
Comilla Victoria Government College